The Wuhai–Maqên Expressway, designated G1816, is an expressway in China's Inner Mongolia, Ningxia and Gansu provinces.

It is complete between Shizuishan and Qingtongxia in Ningxia and between Guanghe County and Hezuo in Gansu. In November 2020, the section between Jingtai and Lanzhou New Area opened. In December 2021, the section between Qingtongxia and Zhongwei opened.

It has been designated as a National Trunk Highway since 2013, but parts of the road were already built as provincial expressways at the time.

Route table

References

See also

Chinese national-level expressways
Expressways in Inner Mongolia
Expressways in Ningxia
Expressways in Gansu
Expressways in Qinghai